Jean-Baptiste Nguema Abessolo, also seen as J.-B. Abessolo-Nguema, (born 15 February 1932) is an educator and writer from Gabon.

Born at Oyem, he was educated there and at Libreville, then studied educational administration at École des Cadres Superieures in Brazzaville and the École Normale Supérieure at Mouyondzi.

He was a school administrator and inspector of primary schools from 1952 to 1982, interrupted only by a year in Paris (1960–61). In December 1982 he became director-general of the International Center for Bantu Civilizations in Libreville.

Abessole has published a number of short stories in both Gabon and France.

Books 

 Les Aventures de Biomo (IPN, 1975) 
 Contes de gazelle. Les Aventures de Biomo. L'Arbre du voyageur (Paris: L'Ecole, 1975) 
 Contes du Gabon (Paris: Cle International, 1981, 1991)

References 

 David E. Gardinier, Historical Dictionary of Gabon, 2nd ed. (The Scarecrow Press, 1994) p. 31

1932 births
Living people
Gabonese short story writers
Male short story writers
Gabonese male writers
People from Oyem
20th-century short story writers
20th-century male writers
Gabonese expatriates in the Republic of the Congo
21st-century Gabonese people